The Tamil-language film industry has produced and released over 10000 films since the release of its first sound film, Kalidas, in 1931. This is a master list of listings of films released from 1931 in the industry by decade of release.

 List of Tamil films of the 1930s
 List of Tamil films of 1940
 List of Tamil films of 1941
 List of Tamil films of 1942
 List of Tamil films of 1943
 List of Tamil films of 1944
 List of Tamil films of 1945
 List of Tamil films of 1946
 List of Tamil films of 1947
 List of Tamil films of 1948
 List of Tamil films of 1949
 List of Tamil films of 1950
 List of Tamil films of 1951
 List of Tamil films of 1952
 List of Tamil films of 1953
 List of Tamil films of 1954
 List of Tamil films of 1955
 List of Tamil films of 1956
 List of Tamil films of 1957
 List of Tamil films of 1958
 List of Tamil films of 1959
 List of Tamil films of 1960
 List of Tamil films of 1961
 List of Tamil films of 1962
 List of Tamil films of 1963
 List of Tamil films of 1964
 List of Tamil films of 1965
 List of Tamil films of 1966
 List of Tamil films of 1967
 List of Tamil films of 1968
 List of Tamil films of 1969
 List of Tamil films of 1970
 List of Tamil films of 1971
 List of Tamil films of 1972
 List of Tamil films of 1973
 List of Tamil films of 1974
 List of Tamil films of 1975
 List of Tamil films of 1976
 List of Tamil films of 1977
 List of Tamil films of 1978
 List of Tamil films of 1979
 List of Tamil films of 1980
 List of Tamil films of 1981
 List of Tamil films of 1982
 List of Tamil films of 1983
 List of Tamil films of 1984
 List of Tamil films of 1985
 List of Tamil films of 1986
 List of Tamil films of 1987
 List of Tamil films of 1988
 List of Tamil films of 1989
 List of Tamil films of 1990
 List of Tamil films of 1991
 List of Tamil films of 1992
 List of Tamil films of 1993
 List of Tamil films of 1994
 List of Tamil films of 1995
 List of Tamil films of 1996
 List of Tamil films of 1997
 List of Tamil films of 1998
 List of Tamil films of 1999
 List of Tamil films of 2000
 List of Tamil films of 2001
 List of Tamil films of 2002
 List of Tamil films of 2003
 List of Tamil films of 2004
 List of Tamil films of 2005
 List of Tamil films of 2006
 List of Tamil films of 2007
 List of Tamil films of 2008
 List of Tamil films of 2009
 List of Tamil films of 2010
 List of Tamil films of 2011
 List of Tamil films of 2012
 List of Tamil films of 2013
 List of Tamil films of 2014
 List of Tamil films of 2015
 List of Tamil films of 2016
 List of Tamil films of 2017
 List of Tamil films of 2018
 List of Tamil films of 2019
 List of Tamil films of 2020
 List of Tamil films of 2021
 List of Tamil films of 2022
 List of Tamil films of 2023

References

Films
Tamil